Casteels is a surname. Notable people with the surname include:

Alexander Casteels the Elder (-1733), Flemish painter
Alexander Casteels the Younger (fl 1687–1716), Flemish painter
Eddy Casteels (born 1960), Belgian basketball coach
Gonzales Franciscus Casteels (?– after 1709), Flemish painter
Koen Casteels (born 1992), Belgian football player
Peter Frans Casteels (fl. 1673–1700), Flemish painter
Pauwels Casteels (– after 1677), Flemish painter
Pieter Casteels II (fl. 1673–1701), Flemish painter
Pieter Casteels III (1684–1749), Flemish painter

See also
Casteel (surname)